Marilhéa Peillard (born Léa Peillard, November 16, 1994, in Dienville) is a French model.

Biography 
While studying art history at the School of Fine Arts of Dijon, Peillard presented herself to the Elite Model Look contest in 2012. She changed her first name, in order to stand out from other girls also named Léa. One of several hundred candidates, she won the French contest before going on to win the international final in Shanghai. She signed a contract for a three-year engagement with Elite Model Management, and relocated to New York.

After her victory, she posed for Elle. She has modelled for Maybelline, Eres, Stradivarius, Maxim, Urban Outfitters and Victoria's Secret.

In 2017, she made her film debut with a small role in Luc Besson's Valerian and the City of a Thousand Planets.

Filmography 
 2017 : Valerian and the City of a Thousand Planets (as Tsûuri)

References 

1994 births
Living people
French female models